Vigdis Hjorth (born 19 July 1959) is a Norwegian novelist. She was long listed for the National book Award.

Life 
She grew up in Oslo, and studied philosophy, literature and political science. In 1983, she published her first novel, the children's book Pelle-Ragnar i den gule gården, for which she received Norsk kulturråd's debut award. 
Her first book for an adult audience was Drama med Hilde (1987). Om bare (2001) is considered her most important novel, and a roman à clef. 

Hjorth has mentioned Dag Solstad, Bertold Brecht and Louis-Ferdinand Céline as important literary influences. Hjorth has three children and lives in Asker.

Works in English 
 A House of Norway, Translated by Charlotte Barslund, Norvik Press 2017. 
 Will and Testament, Translated by Charlotte Barslund, Verso, 2019. .
 Long Live the Post Horn!, Translated by Charlotte Barslund, Verso 2020. 
 Is Mother Dead, Translated by Charlotte Barslund, Verso 2022. ISBN 9781839764318

Selected bibliography 
Gjennom skogen (Through the Forest), 1986
Med hånden på hjertet (Cross My Heart), 1989
Fransk åpning (French Opening), 1992
Død sheriff (Dead Sheriff), 1995
Ubehaget i kulturen (The Cultural Malaise). Co-author with Arild Linneberg, 1995
Takk, ganske bra (Very Nicely, Thank you), 1998
En erotisk forfatters bekjennelser (An Erotic Authors Confessions), 1999
Hva er det med mor (What's wrong with Mother), 2000
Om bare (If only), 2001
Fordeler og ulemper ved å være til (The Pros and Cons of Being Alive), 2005
Hjulskift (Wheel Change), 2006
Tredje person entall, 2008
Snakk til meg (Talk to me), 2010
Leve posthornet! (Long Live the Post Horn!), 2012
Et norsk hus, 2015
Arv og miljø (Will and Testament), 2016
Lærerinnens sang, 2018
Henrik Falk, 2019
Er mor død, 2020

References

External links

Biography and catalogue from the publishing house, Cappelen
Facts about Vigdis Hjorth on Dagbladet.

Living people
1959 births
20th-century Norwegian novelists
21st-century Norwegian novelists
People from Asker
Place of birth missing (living people)
Norwegian women novelists
21st-century Norwegian women writers
20th-century Norwegian women writers